GELID Solutions Ltd. is a designer and manufacturer of CPU and VGA coolers, chassis fans, thermal compounds, accessories and other equipment for computers and electronic devices. The company is based in Hong Kong and has multiple manufacturing facilities in Mainland China and Taiwan.

History 
GELID Solutions was founded in 2008 by Gebhard Scherrer and VC Tran.

In 2009, GELID Solutions launched the GC-Extreme thermal compound which is fully compatible to extreme overclocking and subzero liquid nitrogen cooling. The GC-Extreme thermal compound is reportedly used by famous enthusiast overclockers, such as Matei Mihatoiu, Winner of MSI Master Overclocking Arena EMEA 2011, and Lau Kin Lam, Winner of G.Skill OC World Cup 2015.

In 2013, GELID Solutions manufactured the world's first cooling unit for routers, switches, media players and many other small form-factor devices, the IcyPad. In 2014, the company launched the first 6-channel fan controller with touch screen and 30W power output per channel, the SpeedTouch 6.

In June 2015, GELID Solutions announced a new product series, wearables and wireless chargers at Computex Taipei.

Products 
 Air and liquid cooling
 Wearables
 Energy management accessories

See also 
 Cooler Master
 Deepcool
 Thermaltake
 Thermalright
 Arctic
 Zalman

References

External links 
 

Chinese companies established in 2008
Electronics companies of Hong Kong
Computer hardware cooling
Manufacturing companies established in 2008
2008 establishments in Hong Kong